Jacobus Enschedé II (16 March 1778 in Haarlem – 3 June 1865 in Haarlem) was a Haarlem newspaper editor and printer.

Biography
He was a son of Abraham Enschedé and Sandrina Christina Swaving. For some time he was a partner in the family company. On 5 October 1806 in Haarlem, he married Johanna Christiana Abbensets (Rio de Berbice 22 February 1792 – Haarlem 20 February 1866), the daughter of Lodewijk Christoffel Abbensets and Maria Elisabeth Heijtmeijer. On 6 April 1807, his son Jan Justus Enschedé was born in Haarlem.

References

 Het huis Enschedé 1703–1953, Joh. Enschedé en Zonen, Haarlem 1953
 Enschede aan het Klokhuisplein, (Dutch), by Just Enschede, De Vrieseborch, Haarlem, 1991, 
 Catalogue de la bibliothèque (manuscrits, ouvrages xylographiques, incunables, ouvrages d'estampes, livres curieux et rares) formée pendant le 18e siècle par Messieurs Izaak, Iohannes et le Dr. Iohannes Enschedé, sale catalog for the auction of Enschedé III's collection by Frederik Muller and Martinus Nijhoff, 9 December 1867; version on Google books

1778 births
1865 deaths
People from Haarlem
Dutch businesspeople
Dutch art collectors
Bibliophiles
Dutch printers
Dutch newspaper editors